Kotoriba (earlier Kottori) is a village and municipality in Međimurje County, in northern Croatia.

It is located in the southeastern part of the county, near the Mura River and border with Hungary, approximately 36 kilometres southeast of Čakovec and 20 kilometres east of Prelog, the largest and second-largest cities of Međimurje County, respectively. It is connected with Čakovec by both road and railroad.

Kotoriba is the only village in the municipality. In the 2011 census, it had a population of 3,224.

Kotoriba is known for being the site of the oldest railway station in present-day Croatia. The opening ceremony was held on 24 April 1860.

References

External links
Website of the municipality 

Municipalities of Croatia
Populated places in Međimurje County